Derek Austin Arnold (born 10 January 1941) is a New Zealand rugby union player who played for the All Blacks.

Early life
Arnold was born in 1941 in Balclutha. He attended Christchurch West High School.

Playing career
Arnold played for the Canterbury and South Island sides before being selected for the All Blacks 1963–64 tour of Britain, Ireland, France and North America.

Injury side-lined him in 1968 however he recovered to play again in 1969 and 1970 before retiring.

Later years
During the 2011 Christchurch earthquake, Arnold narrowly missed being in the CTV Building when it collapsed.

References

1941 births
Living people
Canterbury rugby union players
New Zealand international rugby union players
New Zealand rugby union players
People educated at Christchurch West High School
Rugby union players from Balclutha, New Zealand
South Island rugby union players